William Samuel Booth (7 July 1920 – 18 February 1990) was an English football player and manager who played in the English Football League for Brighton & Hove Albion and Port Vale.

Playing career
Booth played for Hove Penguins and Brighton & Hove Albion, before joining First Division club Wolverhampton Wanderers. He was unable to break into their first team at Molineux and moved to Port Vale in the Third Division South in February 1939.

After ten consecutive games for the "Valiants" in 1938–39, he was given a free transfer to league rivals Cardiff City. He later guested for Birmingham City and Leeds United during the war, before moving permanently back to Brighton & Hove Albion after the war. Don Welsh's "Seagulls" finished bottom of the Third Division South in 1947–48 and had to apply for re-election, before rising to sixth place in 1948–49. He then moved into non-league football with newly founded Southern League club Hastings United.

Management career
Booth manageed for Eastbourne from 1966 to 1968, and again in the Athenian League between 1971 and 1972.

Career statistics
Source:

References

1920 births
1990 deaths
People from Hove
English footballers
Association football midfielders
Brighton & Hove Albion F.C. players
Wolverhampton Wanderers F.C. players
Port Vale F.C. players
Cardiff City F.C. players
Leeds United F.C. wartime guest players
Hastings United F.C. (1948) players
English Football League players
Southern Football League players
English football managers
Eastbourne Town F.C. managers